The Canadian province of British Columbia is divided into regional districts as a means to better enable municipalities and rural areas to work together at a regional level.

History

Regional districts came into being via an order of government in 1965 with the enactment of amendments to the Municipal Act. Until the creation of regional districts, the only local form of government in British Columbia were incorporated municipalities, and services in areas outside municipal boundaries had to be sought from the province or through improvement districts.

Governance

Similar to counties in other parts of Canada, regional districts serve only to provide municipal services as the local government in areas not incorporated into a municipality, and in certain regional affairs of shared concern between residents of unincorporated areas and those in the municipalities such as a stakeholder role in regional planning. In those predominantly rural areas, regional districts provide services such as land use planning, building inspection, solid-waste management, and some responsibility for community fire protection.

Most land nominally within a regional district is under the control of the provincial government, or in the case of national parks and offshore waters, the federal government. Indian reserves located within the boundaries of regional districts are likewise excluded from their jurisdiction and infrastructure, and there are varying levels of collaboration between First Nations governments and regional district boards.

Regional districts are governed by boards of directly and indirectly elected directors. Municipalities appoint directors to represent their populations (usually the mayors), while residents of unincorporated areas (which are grouped into electoral areas) elect directors directly. The votes of directors from municipalities generally count more than the votes of directors from electoral areas, and larger municipalities have more votes than smaller ones. For example, both North Saanich and Metchosin appoint one director to the Capital Regional District board of directors, but the vote of North Saanich's director counts three times as much as the vote of Metchosin's appointee.

List

Historical regional districts

The first regional district was established in 1965, and the then-final regional district was established in 1968.

The following regional districts were dissolved in December 1995 and amalgamated largely into the newly formed Fraser Valley Regional District:
 Dewdney–Alouette Regional District: consisting of Mission, Pitt Meadows, and Maple Ridge, and unincorporated areas north of the Fraser River and west of the District of Kent
 Central Fraser Valley Regional District: consisting of the modern City of Abbotsford (itself newly formed at the time) and adjacent unincorporated areasSumas Mountain (now FVRD Electoral H), west of Chilliwack and south of the Fraser River.
 Regional District of Fraser–Cheam: consisting of the eastern two-thirds of the modern Fraser Valley Regional District, including Chilliwack, Kent, Harrison Hot Springs, Hope and the Fraser Canyon unincorporated areas.

The western half of Dewdney–Alouette, consisting of Maple Ridge and Pitt Meadows, was incorporated into the Greater Vancouver Regional District (now Metro Vancouver). Mission and the unincorporated areas east to the Chehalis River were incorporated into the Fraser Valley Regional District.

This amalgamation took place due to the western part of Dewdney–Alouette having become essentially a suburb of Vancouver and the thought it would be better served by being within Metro Vancouver. The Central Fraser Valley RD would be nearly completely dominated by the newly amalgamated City of Abbotsford, bringing the regional district's role into question; similarly, the remnant of Dewdney-Alouette would be dominated by Mission. Given the rapid growth being experienced in the Fraser Valley at the time, which was expected to continue for the foreseeable future, the creation of the Fraser Valley Regional District was seen as the best option.

The Comox–Strathcona Regional District was abolished in February 2008 and replaced by two successor regional districts: Comox Valley and Strathcona.

The Peace River–Liard Regional District was created October 31, 1967, when the regional district system was first being established. On October 31, 1987, it was split into the Peace River Regional District and the Fort Nelson–Liard Regional District, which since has become the Northern Rockies Regional Municipality.

See also

 List of regional district electoral areas in British Columbia
 Administrative divisions of Canada
 List of communities in British Columbia

References

External links
 Regional district maps
 Local Government Department History, Ministry of Community and Rural Development, British Columbia
 Civic Info BC
 A Primer on Regional Districts in British Columbia, BC Government

 
Lists of populated places in British Columbia